The Williams FW26 is a Formula One racing car designed and built by Williams F1 for the 2004 Formula One season. The design team was led by Patrick Head, Gavin Fisher, and Antonia Terzi. It was driven by Ralf Schumacher, Juan Pablo Montoya and Antonio Pizzonia and proved to be one of the most attention-grabbing cars of the season. The FW26 was powered by a BMW 3.0 V10 engine.

Design 
Head supervised the car with the aim of being on the pace immediately, whilst his design team came up with a revolutionary aerodynamics package. The car featured a radical front section, nicknamed the 'Walrus nose'. It featured a short, stubby nosecone connected to the front wing by sloping vertical spars which allowed more airflow to the underside of the car. In an effort to maximise the airflow, the front suspension was designed around the twin keel principle, pioneered by Sauber and also used by McLaren and Jordan.

Season summary 
The FW26 proved fast in pre-season testing and Montoya was tipped as a title favourite, but during the season proper the car proved difficult to set up and was inconsistent, with Montoya and Schumacher both struggling to maximise the car's potential. The car was genuinely outpaced by the Renaults and BARs of that time, as well as the Byrne/Brawn-designed Ferrari F2004, which dominated much of the season. This meant the team was largely in the upper midpack among the competition this year, but not in contention for the title.

The mid-season was especially barren. The cars were disqualified from second and fifth-place finishes in Canada for running brakes that infringed the technical regulations, and Schumacher suffered a heavy crash at Indianapolis, sidelining him for three months, while Montoya was disqualified for the second race in a row. Schumacher's replacements, Marc Gené and Antônio Pizzonia could do little with the car and it was left to Montoya to defend Williams's honour.

The team redesigned the front end of the car in time for the Hungarian Grand Prix and fitted the car with a more conventional nosecone. It was with this configuration that Montoya set the then-all-time fastest F1 lap in pre-qualifying at Monza, almost 163 mph average. This does not stand as a lap record as it was not set during the race. He rounded off the season with a win in Brazil, whilst the returning Schumacher put in strong drives in Japan and China. Following Montoya's win in Brazil, Williams would not score another win until eight years later, at the 2012 Spanish Grand Prix, which was won by Pastor Maldonado in the FW34.

The FW26 was the last Williams Formula One car that was designed under the supervision of longtime Williams technical director Patrick Head.

Complete Formula One results
(key) (results in bold indicate pole position)

Gallery

References

External links

Williams Formula One cars